Henry Terrell (1856-9 September 1944) was the Conservative Party member of Parliament for Gloucester from 15 January 1910 to 14 December 1918. He replaced Russell Rea of the Liberal Party and was succeeded by James Bruton.

References

Members of Parliament for Gloucester
1856 births
1944 deaths
UK MPs 1910
UK MPs 1910–1918
Conservative Party (UK) MPs for English constituencies